Helge Svensen (born 26 February 1953) was a Norwegian luger who competed in the mid-1970s. He won the silver medal in the men's doubles event at the 1976 FIL European Luge Championships in Hammarstrand, Sweden.

Svensen also finished 13th in the men's doubles event at the 1976 Winter Olympics in Innsbruck.

References
1976 Winter Olympic men's doubles results.
List of European luge champions 

Lugers at the 1976 Winter Olympics
Norwegian male lugers
Living people
1953 births
Olympic lugers of Norway